In the calculus of variations and classical mechanics, the Euler–Lagrange equations are a system of second-order ordinary differential equations whose solutions are stationary points of the given action functional. The equations were discovered in the 1750s by Swiss mathematician Leonhard Euler and Italian mathematician Joseph-Louis Lagrange.

Because a differentiable functional is stationary at its local extrema, the Euler–Lagrange equation is useful for solving optimization problems in which, given some functional, one seeks the function minimizing or maximizing it. This is analogous to Fermat's theorem in calculus, stating that at any point where a differentiable function attains a local extremum its derivative is zero. 
In Lagrangian mechanics, according to Hamilton's principle of stationary action, the evolution of a physical system is described by the solutions to the Euler equation for the action of the system. In this context Euler equations are usually called Lagrange equations. In classical mechanics, it is equivalent to Newton's laws of motion; indeed, the Euler-Lagrange equations will produce the same equations as Newton's Laws.  This is particularly useful when analyzing systems whose force vectors are particularly complicated. It has the advantage that it takes the same form in any system of generalized coordinates, and it is better suited to generalizations. In classical field theory there is an analogous equation to calculate the dynamics of a field.

History
The Euler–Lagrange equation was developed in the 1750s by Euler and Lagrange in connection with their studies of the  tautochrone problem. This is the problem of determining a curve on which a weighted particle will fall to a fixed point in a fixed amount of time, independent of the starting point.

Lagrange solved this problem in 1755  and sent the solution to Euler. Both further developed Lagrange's method and applied it to mechanics, which led to the formulation of Lagrangian mechanics. Their correspondence ultimately led to the calculus of variations, a term coined by Euler himself in 1766.

Statement
Let  be a mechanical system with  degrees of freedom. (For those familiar with differential geometry,  is a smooth manifold, and  where  is the tangent bundle of 

A path  is a stationary point of  if and only if

 
Here,  is the time derivative of

Example
A standard example is finding the real-valued function y(x) on the interval [a, b], such that y(a) = c and y(b) = d, for which the  path  length along the curve traced by y is as short as possible. 

the integrand function being .

The partial derivatives of L are:

By substituting these into the Euler–Lagrange equation, we obtain

that is, the function must have a constant first derivative, and thus its graph is a straight line.

Generalizations

Single function of single variable with higher derivatives
The stationary values of the functional

can be obtained from the Euler–Lagrange equation 

under fixed boundary conditions for the function itself as well as for the first  derivatives (i.e. for all ). The endpoint values of the highest derivative  remain flexible.

Several functions of single variable with single derivative
If the problem involves finding several functions of a single independent variable that define an extremum of the functional

then the corresponding Euler–Lagrange equations are

Single function of several variables with single derivative
A multi-dimensional generalization comes from considering a function on n variables. If  is some surface, then

 

is extremized only if f satisfies the partial differential equation

 

When n = 2 and functional  is the energy functional, this leads to the soap-film minimal surface problem.

Several functions of several variables with single derivative
If there are several unknown functions to be determined and several variables such that
 
the system of Euler–Lagrange equations is

Single function of two variables with higher derivatives
If there is a single unknown function f to be determined that is dependent on two variables x1 and x2 and if the functional depends on higher derivatives of f up to n-th order such that
 
then the Euler–Lagrange equation is

which can be represented shortly as:

wherein  are indices that span the number of variables, that is, here they go from 1 to 2.

Several functions of several variables with higher derivatives
If there are p unknown functions fi to be determined that are dependent on m variables x1 ... xm and if the functional depends on higher derivatives of the fi up to n-th order such that

where  are indices that span the number of variables, that is they go from 1 to m. Then the Euler–Lagrange equation is

This can be expressed more compactly as

Generalization to manifolds
Let  be a smooth manifold, and let  denote the space of smooth functions . Then, for functionals  of the form

where  is the Lagrangian, the statement  is equivalent to the statement that, for all , each coordinate frame trivialization  of a neighborhood of  yields the following  equations:

See also

Lagrangian mechanics
Hamiltonian mechanics
Analytical mechanics
Beltrami identity
Functional derivative

Notes

References
 
 
 
 
 Roubicek, T.: ''Calculus of variations. Chap.17 in: Mathematical Tools for Physicists. (Ed. M. Grinfeld) J. Wiley, Weinheim, 2014, pp. 551–588.

Ordinary differential equations
Partial differential equations
Calculus of variations
Articles containing proofs
Leonhard Euler